Eupithecia eszterkae is a moth in the family Geometridae first described by András Mátyás Vojnits in 1976. It is found in Shaanxi, China.

References

Moths described in 1976
eszterkae
Moths of Asia